Pine Ridge station is a SEPTA Route 101 trolley stop in Springfield Township, Delaware County, Pennsylvania. It is officially located at Pine Ridge Drive and Beechwood Road, however the intersection with Beechwood Road lies north of the station.

Trolleys arriving at this station travel between 69th Street Terminal in Upper Darby, Pennsylvania and Orange Street in Media, Pennsylvania. The station has a shed with a roof where people can go inside when it is raining. It also has free parking and a power station next to the shed. East of this station, the Route 101 line narrows down from two tracks to one as it enters Smedley County Park and goes back to two tracks east of  PA Route 420.

Station layout

External links

 Station from Pine Ridge Road from Google Maps Street View

SEPTA Media–Sharon Hill Line stations